The Trinidad and Tobago women's national rugby union team is a national sporting side that represents Trinidad and Tobago in Women's rugby union. They played their first test match in 2003 and compete annually in the Rugby Americas North Women's Rugby Championship.

History

Results summary
(Full internationals only)

Results

Full internationals

See also
 Trinidad and Tobago national rugby union team
 Rugby union in Trinidad and Tobago
 Trinidad and Tobago Rugby Football Union
 Trinidad and Tobago national rugby sevens team

External links
 Trinidad and Tobago on IRB.com
 Trinidad and Tobago Rugby Football Union
 Trinidad and Tobago on rugbydata.com

Caribbean women's national rugby union teams
Rugby union in Trinidad and Tobago
Rugby union

fr:Équipe de Trinité-et-Tobago de rugby à XV